Stephen Welch (born July 28, 1972) is an American wheelchair tennis player.

Biography
Welch was born in Fort Worth, Texas. Since he was four-years-old he was into a competition. By the age of eight he was diagnosed with Legg–Calvé–Perthes syndrome. He won 100 major titles since 1992, which includes three U.S. Open titles. He also won 5 National championships in the National Wheelchair Basketball Association and also three MVP awards. He attended Paralympic games starting from 1996, but only won one silver medal for singles and one silver for doubles in the 1996 Summer Paralympics and won gold for singles and another bronze for doubles at the Sydney Paralympic Games. He also participated at the 2011 Parapan American Games where he won gold medal for doubles  and a bronze one for singles. In 1996 and 2000 he played wheelchair basketball for the Olympics but didn't get any medals for it.
In 2001 Steve challenged radio jockey Howard Stern to a tennis match. They played at the Crosstown Tennis at Fifth Ave in New York City in a single set match where Steve defeated Howard Stern 6-0.

References

External links
 

1972 births
Living people
Paralympic gold medalists for the United States
Paralympic silver medalists for the United States
Paralympic bronze medalists for the United States
American men's wheelchair basketball players
Paralympic wheelchair tennis players of the United States
Wheelchair tennis players at the 1996 Summer Paralympics
Wheelchair tennis players at the 2000 Summer Paralympics
Sportspeople from Fort Worth, Texas
Medalists at the 1996 Summer Paralympics
Medalists at the 2000 Summer Paralympics
Paralympic medalists in wheelchair tennis
ITF World Champions
20th-century American people